Manda National Park is a national park in Chad.

It is located in southern Chad near the town of Sarh and bordered. Chari River to the east and to the south west is Sarh-Ndjamena road. The park occupies more than 113,000hac and was established in 1965, prior being only a faunal reserve since 1953.

Mammals in the park include lion and other large mammal that can only be seen during the dry season. Some of the birds found in Manda National Park Chad include Yellow penduline tit, Senegal Eremomela, blackcap babbler, white collared starling, bush petronia, Rufous Cisticola, Gambaga fly catcher and the red faced pytilia among many others.
Manda National Park was initially created for the protection of Derby's eland, but like the African elephant, this species disappeared from the park at the end of 1980s.

References

National parks of Chad
Protected areas established in 1969